WCHM (1490 AM) and 94.3 FM is a radio station broadcasting a News Talk Information format. Licensed to Clarkesville, Georgia, United States.  The station is currently owned by WCHM Radio, LLC, an affiliated company of Batten Communications, inc. and features programming from Premiere Radio Networks and FOX News Radio.  Major shows include Rush Limbaugh, Erick Erickson, Mark Levin, Sean Hannity, Clark Howard, Michael Savage and Coast to Coast with George Noory. The station also features local programming and University of Georgia sports programming.

WCHM has been granted an FCC construction permit to decrease both day and night power to 790 watts. The current antenna will be replaced by one that is more efficient. The power reduction is necessary to prevent new interference to other stations on that frequency.

References

External links

CHM
Radio stations established in 1992